is a Japanese anime series by Nippon Animation. This 1982 adaptation is part of the studio's popular World Masterpiece Theater franchise, based on the 1982 novel Southern Rainbow by Australian writer Phyllis Piddington (1910–2001), and tells the story of a young girl named Lucy and the hardships and excitement she and her family encounter when they move from England to Adelaide in Australia to start a farm.

Not only it is the first anime in the World Masterpiece Theater to have been broadcast while the author of the source material was still alive (followed by Story of the Alps: My Annette, The Bush Baby and Kon'nichiwa Anne: Before Green Gables), but it also is the only one to have aired when the original work wasn't finished yet. At the time of the broadcasting in Japan in 1982, Southern Rainbow was still in phase of serialization on an Australian family daily magazine, prior to be published as a book later that same year. Another adaptation of the story, written by Ken Wakasaki as a tie-in to the anime, was also published in Japan in 1982.

The anime has been dubbed into French, Italian, Arabic, Spanish, German, and Persian.

Cast
Minori Matsushima as ルーシー・メイ (Lucy-May)
Ikuko Tani as Annie
Katsunosuke Hori as Arthur
Rihoko Yoshida as Kate

Episodes
 To a New land
 Cute Fellow
 The Replacement
 First Exploration
 After the Rain
 A Town Named Adelaide
 Ben's Misfortune
 Night Before Departure
 Road to Adelaide
 Green Town
 My Small House
 Night at Adelaide
 Ben Has Arrived
 A Stout Man
 Two Homes
 Drenched Doctor
 Unfortunate Accident
 Tree Climbing
 Shopping Tine
 Water in the Well
 Adelaide's Designer
 Children of Brick and Dingo
 Your Name is Little
 The Day Which Marks The End Of Summer
 When I'm Not Brought Along
 I Got Sick!
 Ride on the Wind
 Land Opposite the River
 Little's Training
 Birthday Present
 Little and Black Dog
 Bridge over the Rainbow
 Lost Dream
 Little and School
 Duel
 Five Shillings in the Nest
 Bandits of the Grassland
 Detective Lucy
 Two Farewells
 Who Am I?
 A Town I Do Not Know, A Person I Do Not Recognize
 A Child Called Emily
 Missing Each Other
 Little! Little!
 Tob's Vanished
 A Wombat In The Hole
 Father's Decision
 Rich Child
 Clara's Marriage
 Toward's the Rainbow

Music
 Opening Theme: "Niji ni Naritai" by Sumiko Yamagata
 Ending Theme: "Mori ni Oide" by Sumiko Yamagata

References

External links 

1982 anime television series debuts
Adventure anime and manga
Drama anime and manga
Historical anime and manga
Fictional people from South Australia
Television shows based on Australian novels
Television shows set in South Australia
World Masterpiece Theater series
Fuji TV original programming
Television series set in the 1830s